The 2015–16 season was Galatasarays 112nd in existence and 58th consecutive season in the Süper Lig. They were aiming to lift an unprecedented 21st Turkish title, after winning the Süper Lig in the previous season.

In Europe, Galatasaray competed in the UEFA Champions League for a fifteenth season. They also competed in the UEFA Europa League, the Turkish Cup and the Turkish Super Cup.

This article shows statistics of the club's players in the season, and also lists all matches that the club played in the season. The season covered a period from 1 July 2015 to 30 June 2016.

Club

Technical Staff

Medical Staff

   Gürbey Kahveci

Board of Directors

Grounds

Kit
Uniform Manufacturer: Nike

Chest Advertising's: United Nations Development Programme (for League) / Turkish Airlines (for CL)

Back Advertising's: Garenta

Arm Advertising's: N/A

Short Advertising's: Coca-Cola

Socks Advertising's: Ariston Thermo

Sponsorship
Companies that Galatasaray S.K. had sponsorship deals with during the season included the following.

Season overview

 On 31 May 2015, Galatasaray revealed the pre-season summer camp schedule. The camp schedule for the Galatasaray professional football team prior to the next football season began on 5 July at the Windischgarsten, Austria.
 On 13 June 2015, it was announced that head coach Hamza Hamzaoğlu had extended his ongoing contract for three more years.
 On 17 June 2015, it was announced that Galatasaray had begun official negotiations regarding the transfer of Turkish player Bilal Kısa from Akhisar Belediyespor.
 On 18 June 2015, it was announced that defender Sabri Sarıoğlu had extended his contract until 2016.
 On 25 June 2015, it was announced that Galatasaray had sold Nordin Amrabat to Málaga. Málaga had triggered the €3.5 million buyout clause for him.
 On 26 June 2015, it was announced that Galatasaray would not participate in the Afyon Cup between 11 and 14 July. Instead, the club played against SV Ried in Austria on 14 July.
 On 28 June 2015, Galatasaray's second pre-season camp schedule was announced. The second camp prior to the start of the league season began on 20 July at the Velden in Austria.
 On 2 July 2015, it wqs announced that Galatasaray had loaned out Endoğan Adili to FC Wil.
 On 2 July 2015, it was announced that Galatasaray had begun official negotiations regarding the transfer of German player Lukas Podolski from Arsenal. The original bid by Galatasaray was reported as €2.5 million, with Podolski also receiving a salary of €3 million per year.
 On 7 July 2015, it was announced that Galatasaray had sold Goran Pandev to Genoa.
 On 8 July 2015, it was announced that Galatasaray had begun official negotiations regarding the transfer of Turkish player Jem Paul Karacan from Reading. Cem Karacan was set to receive a salary of €0.6 million per year.
 On 11 July 2015, it was announced that Galatasaray had begun official negotiations regarding the transfer of French player Lionel Carole from Troyes. The original bid by Galatasaray was reported as €1.5 million, with Carole also receiving a salary of €0.7 million per year.
 On 14 July 2015, it was announced that Galatasaray had loaned out winger Bruma to Real Sociedad for €1.9 million. Real Sociedad also had a buy-out option for €7.5 million.
 On 20 July 2015, it was announced that Dany Nounkeu, Lucas Ontivero, Furkan Özçal and Umut Gündoğan would not be included the second camp squad.
 On 23 July 2015, Galatasaray's 2015–16 home and away kits were revealed.
 On 30 July 2015, it was announced that the contract of Dany Nounkeu had been terminated by Galatasaray.
 On 31 July 2015, it was announced that Galatasaray had begun official negotiations regarding the transfer of Spanish player José Rodríguez from Real Madrid. Galatasaray would not be paying any transfer fee for the player, and José Rodríguez was also receiving a salary of €800,000 per year.
 On 5 August 2015, it was announced that Berk İsmail Ünsal and Emre Can Coşkun had been loaned out to Giresunspor and Alanyaspor, respectively.
 On 5 August 2015, it was announced that the club had extended the contracts of Alperen Uysal and Furkan Özçal. Subsequently, they were loaned out to Gaziantepspor and Kayserispor, respectively.
 On 6 August 2015, it was announced that Yekta Kurtuluş and Blerim Džemaili had not been included in the league squad. They were placed on the transfer list by the club.
 On 6 August 2015, it was announced that Galatasaray would participate in the Trofeo Bernabéu against Real Madrid on 18 August.
 On 8 August 2015, Galatasaray won the 2015 Turkish Super Cup against Bursaspor.
 On 13 August 2015, it was announced that Sercan Yıldırım had been loaned out to Bursaspor.
 On 13 August 2015, it was announced that Felipe Melo had extended his contract until 2019.
 On 17 August 2015, it was announced that the contract of Yekta Kurtuluş had been terminated by Galatasaray for €600,000.
 On 27 August 2015, it was announced that Umut Gündoğan had been loaned out to Şanlıurfaspor until the end of the season.
 On 28 August 2015, it was announced that Galatasaray had begun official negotiations regarding the transfer of Turkish player Cenk Gönen from Beşiktaş. The original bid by Galatasaray was reported as €600,000, with Cenk also receiving a salary of €900,000 per year.
 On 29 August 2015, it was announced that Galatasaray had begun official negotiations regarding the transfer of Belgian player Jason Denayer from Manchester City. The original bid by Galatasaray was reported as €430,000, with Denayer also receiving a salary of €800,000.
 On 30 August 2015, it was announced that Blerim Džemaili had been loaned out to Genoa.
 On 31 August 2015, it was announced that Alex Telles had been loaned out to Inter Milan for €1.3 million. Inter also had a buy-out option for €8.5 million.
 On 31 August 2015, it was announced that Felipe Melo had been sold to Inter Milan for €3.7 million.
 On 31 August 2015, it was announced that Galatasaray had begun official negotiations regarding the transfer of German player Kevin Großkreutz from Borussia Dortmund. The original bid by Galatasaray was reported as €1.5 million, with Großkreutz also receiving a salary of €1.85 million for the first year.
 On 2 September 2015, it was announced by FIFA that Galatasaray had failed to submit the relevant documentation for Kevin Großkreutz before the transfer window had closed. FIFA dismissed the case, because the signed documentations were not submitted on time by Galatasaray. FIFA refused to sanction Großkreutz's proposed move from Borussia Dortmund, and therefore the player was not available for Galatasaray until 1 January 2016.
 On 3 October 2015, it was announced that the contract of Wesley Sneijder had been extended by Galatasaray until 2018.
 On 9 October 2015, it was announced that the contract of Hakan Balta had been extended by Galatasaray until 2018.
 On 18 November 2015, Galatasaray announced the dismissal of head coach Hamza Hamzaoğlu.
 On 18 November 2015, it was announced that Galatasaray had entered negotiations with Mustafa Denizli.
 On 5 January 2016, it was announced that Galatasaray had begun official negotiations regarding the transfer of Dutch player Ryan Donk from Kasımpaşa. The original bid by Galatasaray was reported as €2.5 million, with Donk also receiving a salary of €750,000 during the second half of the season.
 On 6 January 2016, it was announced that Kevin Großkreutz had been sold to VfB Stuttgart for €2.2 million.
 On 12 January 2016, it was announced that Galatasaray had begun official negotiations regarding the transfer of Norwegian player Martin Linnes from Molde. The original bid by Galatasaray was reported as €2 million, with Linnes also receiving a salary of €475,000 during the second half of the season.
 On 1 February 2016, it was announced that Jem Karacan had been loaned out to Bursaspor for the rest of the season.
 On 5 February 2016, it was announced that Burak Yılmaz had been sold to Beijing Guoan for €8 million.
 On 1 March 2016, Galatasaray announced the dismissal of head coach Mustafa Denizli.
 On 2 March 2016, Galatasaray was banned from European competitions for one season by UEFA. Galatasaray were not able to qualify for either the UEFA Champions League or UEFA Europa League this season due to their failure to comply with financial regulations. The ban would come into force the first time that the Istanbul club qualified for either the Champions League or the Europa League within the next two seasons, though the sanction would be waived if Galatasaray failed to qualify for any continental competition in that timeframe.
 On 16 March 2016, Galatasaray announced that interim manager Jan Olde Riekerink would become the head of youth development.

Players

Squad information

Transfers

In

Total spending:  €11M

Out

Total income:  €21.3M

Expenditure:  €10.3M

Competitions

Overall

Pre-season, Mid-Season and friendlies

Turkish Super Cup

Süper Lig

League table

Results summary

Results by round

Matches

Turkish Cup

UEFA Champions League

Group stage

UEFA Europa League

Round of 32

Statistics

Squad statistics

Statistics accurate as of 27 May 2016.

Goals
Includes all competitive matches. In the case of a tie in total number of goals, players with more goals in Europe are ranked higher, followed by Süper Lig, Super Cup and Turkish Cup goals respectively. If all stats are the same, then the younger player is ranked higher.

Last updated on 27 May 2016

Assists
Last updated on 26 May 2016.

Disciplinary record

Overall

Attendance

 Sold season tickets: 32,070 & 197 suites = 34,237

See also
 2015–16 Süper Lig
 2015–16 Turkish Cup
 2015 Turkish Super Cup
 2015–16 UEFA Champions League

References

External links
Galatasaray Sports Club Official Website 
Turkish Football Federation - Galatasaray A.Ş. 
uefa.com - Galatasaray AŞ

2015-16
Turkish football clubs 2015–16 season
2015–16 UEFA Champions League participants seasons
2015 in Istanbul
2016 in Istanbul
Galatasaray Sports Club 2015–16 season